Perfect Nanny (released as Lullaby in the UK) is a 2019 French drama film based on the eponymous novel by Leïla Slimani.

Cast 
 Karin Viard - Louise
 Leïla Bekhti - Myriam
 Antoine Reinartz - Paul
  - Sylvie

References

External links 

2019 drama films
French drama films
2010s French films